Fa Ham is a tambon (subdistrict) of Mueang Chiang Mai District, in Chiang Mai Province, Thailand. In 2020 it had a total population of 7,892 people.

Administration

Central administration
The tambon is subdivided into 7 administrative villages (muban).

Local administration
The area of the subdistrict is shared by 2 local governments.
the city (Thesaban Nakhon) Chiang Mai (เทศบาลนครเชียงใหม่)
the subdistrict municipality (Thesaban Tambon) Fa Ham (เทศบาลตำบลฟ้าฮ่าม)

References

External links
Thaitambon.com on Fa Ham 

Tambon of Chiang Mai province
Populated places in Chiang Mai province